Lewis Riggs (January 16, 1789 – November 6, 1870) was an American physician and politician who served one term as a U.S. Representative from New York from 1841 to 1843.

Biography 
Born in Norfolk, Connecticut, Riggs attended the common schools and schools of Latin and Greek.
He was apprenticed to the carpenter's trade.

He studied medicine in the village of Torringford, Connecticut, and received his diploma in May 1812.
He also attended medical lectures given by Benjamin Rush at the University of Pennsylvania, Philadelphia, Pennsylvania, in 1812.
Practiced in East Winsted, Connecticut.
He moved to Vernon, New York, in 1813 and later to Homer, New York, continuously practicing his profession.

Political career 
He also engaged in business as a retail druggist and in 1828 in the sale of dry goods.
He served as secretary of the Cortland County Medical Society 1820–1823 and as president in 1825 and 1826.
He was appointed postmaster of Homer by President Jackson on April 25, 1829, and served until August 7, 1839.

Congress 
He was elected as a Democrat to the Twenty-seventh Congress (March 4, 1841 – March 3, 1843).

Later career and death 
He resumed the practice of medicine.
Also operated a flour mill.

He died in Homer, New York, November 6, 1870.
He was interred in Glenwood Cemetery.

Sources

External links 
 

1789 births
1870 deaths
New York (state) postmasters
Democratic Party members of the United States House of Representatives from New York (state)
19th-century American politicians
People from Norfolk, Connecticut